Tân Lộc may refer to several places in Vietnam, including:

Tân Lộc, Cần Thơ, a ward of Thốt Nốt District
Tân Lộc, Hà Tĩnh, a commune of Lộc Hà District
Tân Lộc, Vĩnh Long, a commune of Tam Bình District
Tân Lộc, Cà Mau, a commune of Thới Bình District

See also
The communes of Tân Lộc Bắc and Tân Lộc Đông in Thới Bình District, Cà Mau Province